Luis Pedro Cavanda (born 2 January 1991) is a Belgian professional footballer who last played as a right-back for Swiss club Neuchâtel Xamax. Born in Angola, Cavanda represents Belgian internationally.

He also holds Congolese citizenship.

Career

Youth
Cavanda moved to Belgium at a young age and began playing for the Belgian club Standard Liège. In January 2007, Cavanda joined Lazio. With Lazio, Cavanda spent three-and-a-half years with the youth side.

Lazio
In 2009, Cavanda made a substitute appearance in a 4–0 win away to Bulgarian club Levski Sofia in the UEFA Europa League. He got his first start in the return match at the Stadio Olimpico, which Lazio lost 0–1.

On 29 August 2010, Cavanda made his Serie A debut, replacing Simone Del Nero in the second half of Lazio's opening day 2–0 loss to Sampdoria at the Stadio Luigi Ferraris.

His first league start for Lazio came at the Stadio Olimpico against eventual champions Milan. Cavanda earned plaudits with an impressive display against former FIFA World Player of the Year and World Cup winner Ronaldinho.

In January 2011, he was loaned to Torino until the end of the season. Cavanda returned to Lazio after making just three appearances for the Turin club.

Having played regularly in Serie A and in the Europa League during the 2011–12 season, Cavanda cemented his spot as a first choice in the 2012–13 season, replacing Abdoulay Konko. Predominantly playing at right back, Cavanda also played at left back, making him a very versatile full back. Cavanda matured under manager Vladimir Petkovic and became an important player in Lazio's squad.

Trabzonspor
On 12 July 2015, Cavanda signed for Turkish side Trabzonspor.

Galatasaray
Cavanda signed a three-year contract with Turkish club Galatasaray on 9 August 2016 for an initial fee of €1.8 million.

Standard Liège
On 17 March 2018, he played as Standard Liège beat Genk 1–0 in extra time to win the 2018 Belgian Cup Final and qualify for the UEFA Europa League.

Failure to join with Trepça'89
On 17 February 2021, he signed for Kosovan club Trepça '89 in the Kosovar Superliga. Two days later, he refused to sign the final contract because he did not like the club infrastructure.

Neuchâtel Xamax
On 23 May 2022 Swiss Challenge League club Neuchâtel Xamax confirmed, that Cavanda had joined the club on a one-year deal. After six appearances for the club, Cavanda broke a bone in his face during a training session at the end of August 2022.

International career
On 10 October 2015, he made his senior debut for the national team in a 4–1 win in a UEFA Euro 2016 qualification match against Andorra.

Personal life
Cavanda was born in Angola, to an Angolan father and a Congolese mother, and migrated to Belgium at a young age. He holds Belgian nationality. Despite having made youth level appearances for Belgium, Cavanda remained eligible to represent the Angolan and the Congolese national teams. Even though he initially opted for the latter in March 2015, he was called up by the Belgium national football team on 2 October 2015. He plays in the UEFA qualifying game for the nation cup in France against Andorra. This means he only can play for Belgium now.

Statistics
Statistics accurate as of match played 26 October 2015

Honours
Standard Liège
 Belgian Cup: 2018

References

External links

Luis Pedro Cavanda at aic.football.it

1991 births
Living people
Belgian footballers
Belgian expatriate footballers
Footballers from Luanda
Angolan emigrants to Belgium
Naturalised citizens of Belgium
Association football fullbacks
Black Belgian sportspeople
Belgian people of Angolan descent
Belgium youth international footballers
Belgium under-21 international footballers
Belgium international footballers
Belgian sportspeople of Democratic Republic of the Congo descent
Standard Liège players
S.S. Lazio players
Torino F.C. players
S.S.C. Bari players
Trabzonspor footballers
Galatasaray S.K. footballers
Neuchâtel Xamax FCS players
Serie A players
Serie B players
Süper Lig players
Belgian Pro League players
Swiss Challenge League players
Expatriate footballers in Italy
Expatriate footballers in Turkey
Expatriate footballers in Switzerland
Belgian expatriate sportspeople in Italy
Belgian expatriate sportspeople in Turkey
Belgian expatriate sportspeople in Switzerland